The White Angel (Italian: L'angelo bianco) is a 1943 Italian drama film directed by Giulio Antamoro, Federico Sinibaldi and Ettore Giannini and starring Emma Gramatica, Filippo Scelzo and Beatrice Mancini.

Cast

References

Bibliography 
 Goble, Alan. The Complete Index to Literary Sources in Film. Walter de Gruyter, 1999.

External links 
 

Italian drama films
1943 films
1940s Italian-language films
Films directed by Giulio Antamoro
Films directed by Ettore Giannini
Italian black-and-white films
1943 drama films
1940s Italian films